Infanta Marie Anne of Portugal (13 July 1861 – 31 July 1942) was Grand Duchess of Luxembourg as the wife of Grand Duke Guillaume IV. She was the regent of Luxembourg between 1908 and 1912; first during the illness of her spouse, and then in the name of their daughter, Grand Duchess Marie-Adélaïde.

Family

Born at Schloss Bronnbach in Bronnbach, Wertheim am Main, Kingdom of Württemberg, Infanta Marie Anne (or Maria Ana) was the fifth child and second-youngest daughter of the deposed King Miguel of Portugal and his wife Princess Adelaide of Löwenstein-Wertheim-Rosenberg. She was a member of the House of Braganza. At the time of her birth, her father had been exiled, and the family lived as guests in the Austro-Hungarian Empire.

In spite of their circumstances, the daughters of Princess Adélaïde and Miguel made royal marriages, some to reigning monarchs and deposed heads of Roman Catholic European dynasties.

Marriage and children

Before her marriage with William IV, Grand Duke of Luxembourg, she was considered by Emperor Franz Joseph I of Austria as a suitable bride to his only son and heir, Crown Prince Rudolf, but Rudolf did not like her, and she would remain single for the next years.

Maria Ana was married on 21 June 1893 at Schloss Fischhorn, Zell am See, to the Protestant Wilhelm, Hereditary Grand Duke of Luxembourg, the son and heir apparent of Adolf, Grand Duke of Luxembourg, head of the House of Nassau. It was agreed that the children would be raised in their mother's Catholic faith, the religion of the overwhelming majority of Luxembourg's population.

The couple had six daughters.
 Marie-Adélaïde, Grand Duchess of Luxembourg (1894–1924), who remained unmarried and childless
 Charlotte, Grand Duchess of Luxembourg (1896–1985), who married her first cousin Prince Felix of Bourbon-Parma, a son of Marie Anne's younger sister.
 Princess Hilda  (Berg Castle, 15 February 1897 – Berg Castle, 8 September 1979), married in Berg Castle on 29 October 1930 Adolf 10te Fürst zu Schwarzenberg (Frauenberg, 18 August 1890 – Bordighera, 27 February 1950), without issue
 Princess Antonia (1899–1954), who married Rupprecht, Crown Prince of Bavaria as his second wife
 Princess Elisabeth (Luxembourg, 7 March 1901 – Schloss Hohenburg, 2 August 1950), married in Schloss Hohenburg on 14 November 1922 Prince Ludwig Philipp of Thurn and Taxis (Regensburg, 2 February 1901 – Schloss Niederaichbach, 22 April 1933), son of Albert I, Prince of Thurn and Taxis, and had issue
 Princess Sophie (Berg Castle, 14 February 1902 – Munich, 24 May 1941), married at Schloss Hohenburg on 12 April 1921 Prince Ernst Heinrich of Saxony (Dresden, 9 December 1896 – Edingen-Neckarhausen, West Germany, 14 June 1971), youngest son of king Frederick Augustus III of Saxony, and had issue

Grand Duchess and regent

Wilhelm IV became grand duke on the death of his father on 17 November 1905, and Marie Anne became grand duchess. Because Wilhelm was the last agnate of the House of Nassau, he had Marie-Adélaïde confirmed and proclaimed heir presumptive on 10 July 1907.

Marie Anne was regent for her husband during his terminal illness from 19 November 1908 to 15 February 1912. She then continued as regent for her daughter, Grand Duchess Marie-Adélaïde, during her minority from 25 February 1912 to 18 June 1912. Marie-Adélaïde eventually abdicated in favor of her younger sister, Marie Anne's second daughter Charlotte in 1919.

During World War II the grand ducal family left Luxembourg shortly before the arrival of Nazi troops, settling in France until their capitulation, in June 1940.

Subsequently, the family and Grand Duchess Charlotte’s ministers received transit visas to Portugal from the Portuguese consul Aristides de Sousa Mendes, in June 1940. After travelling through Coimbra and Lisbon, the family first stayed in Cascais, in Casa de Santa Maria, owned by Manuel Espírito Santo, who was then the honorary consul for Luxembourg in Portugal. By July they had moved to Monte Estoril, staying at the Chalet Posser de Andrade. Marie Anne stayed in Monte Estoril with her daughter, the Grand Duchess Charlotte, until 3 October 1940. On the same day, they boarded the Pan Am Yankee Clipper headed for New York City, from where they then left for Canada. With them travelled Prince Félix’s aide de camp Guillaume Konsbruck, his wife Nelly and their sons, Guy and Carlo.

Marie Anne died in exile in New York on 31 July 1942.

See also
 Descendants of Miguel I of Portugal

Ancestry

References

|-

1861 births
1942 deaths
Grand Ducal Consorts of Luxembourg
Dames of the Order of Saint Isabel
House of Nassau-Weilburg
20th-century women rulers
House of Braganza
Burials at Notre-Dame Cathedral, Luxembourg
Portuguese infantas
Luxembourg–Portugal relations
19th-century Portuguese people
19th-century Portuguese women
20th-century rulers in Europe
Royal reburials
Daughters of kings